In romance languages, nomen à clef or nomen à clé (French for "name with a key"), is a name describing a real person, behind a façade of fiction. "Key" in this context means a table one can use to swap out the names.  
It is the nomenclature complement of the roman à clef.

See also

 Roman à clef
 Film à clef
 Allegory
 Autobiographical novel
 Literary technique
 Semi-fiction

References

Fiction